Lucozade is a soft drink.

Lucozade may also refer to:

 Lucozade (poem), by Jackie Kay
 Lucozade (song), by Zayn Malik